
Gmina Grabowo is a rural gmina (administrative district) in Kolno County, Podlaskie Voivodeship, in north-eastern Poland.

Villages
Gmina Grabowo contains the villages and settlements of Andrychy, Bagińskie, Borzymy, Chełchy, Ciemianka, Dąbrowa, Gałązki, Gnatowo, Golanki, Grabowo, Grabowskie, Grądy-Michały, Grądy-Możdżenie, Guty Podleśne, Jadłówek, Kamińskie, Konopki-Białystok, Konopki-Monety, Kownacin, Kurkowo, Łebki Duże, Łebki Małe, Łubiane, Marki, Milewo-Gałązki, Pasichy, Przyborowo, Rosochate, Siwki, Skroda Wielka, Stare Guty, Stawiane, Surały, Świdry Podleśne, Świdry-Dobrzyce, Wiszowate, Wojsławy and Żebrki.

Neighbouring gminas
Gmina Grabowo is bordered by the gminas of Biała Piska, Kolno, Przytuły, Stawiski, Szczuczyn and Wąsosz.

References

Polish official population figures 2006

Grabowo
Kolno County